St. Joseph Football Club is an association football club based in Nakuru, Kenya. The club currently competes in the Kenyan National Super League.

References

External links

Kenyan National Super League clubs
FKF Division One clubs
Football clubs in Kenya